YR, Yr or yr may refer to:

Characters

 Yr (Younger Futhark), ᛦ  (transliterated Ʀ), a rune of the Younger Futhark
 Ur (rune), ᚣ (transliterated y), used in Anglo-Saxon manuscript tradition
 Yr (digraph), two characters used as a unit in mainland China's official Pinyin romanization system to write the single vowel /r̝/ in certain languages

Abbreviations
YR, Yr or yr, with or without punctuation, may be abbreviations for: 
 Year
 Younger (title)
 Yves Rocher (company)
 Command & Conquer: Yuri's Revenge, a module for the game Red Alert 2
 You’re right (internet talk)
Yorkshire Rider, a former British bus operator.
 YR, the aircraft registration prefix for Romania

Other uses
 yr.no, a Norwegian weather-related site
 Yr (album), by Steve Tibbetts
 Ýr, a female given name used in Faroese and Icelandic

See also 
 Y&R (disambiguation)